Pantacordis scotinella is a moth of the family Autostichidae. It is found on Crete.

References

Moths described in 1916
Pantacordis
Moths of Europe